McGillin may refer to:

Howard McGillin (born 1953), American actor
McGillin's Olde Ale House, tavern in Philadelphia, Pennsylvania